Mulena Yomuhulu Mbumu wa Litunga Ngalama was a High Chief of Lozi people in Barotseland Zambia, Africa.

Biography
Ngalama was a son of Prince Ingulamwa, Chief of Mokola, who was a son of Queen Mbuymamwambwa.

He was adopted by his paternal uncle, Chief Inyambo, and he succeeded on the death of his other uncle, king Yeta I.

Ngalama had married a daughter of his uncle, Prince Mwanambinyi.

He died at Kwandu, having had sons who were kings: Yeta II Nalute and Ngombala.

His grandson was Prince Mbanga.

References

Year of birth missing
Litungas